The Ottawa Journal was a daily broadsheet newspaper published in Ottawa, Ontario, Canada, from 1885 to 1980.

It was founded in 1885 by A. Woodburn as the Ottawa Evening Journal. Its first editor was John Wesley Dafoe who came from the Winnipeg Free Press. In 1886, it was bought by Philip Dansken Ross.

The paper began publishing a morning edition in 1917. In 1919, the paper's publishers bought the Ottawa Free Press, whose former owner, E. Norman Smith, then became editor with Grattan O'Leary.

In 1959, it was bought by F.P. Publications. By then, the Journal, whose readers tended to come from rural areas, was trailing the Ottawa Citizen, its main competitor. The paper encountered labour problems in the 1970s and never really recovered.

In 1980, it was bought by Thomson Newspapers and was closed on 27 August 1980. That left Southam Newspapers's Ottawa Citizen as the only major English-language newspaper in Ottawa (Le Droit remaining the only French-language daily newspaper in Ottawa).

The closure aroused considerable controversy since a day later, Southam closed the Winnipeg Tribune, the primary rival to Thomson's Winnipeg Free Press. Concern over both incidents prompted the Government of Canada to conduct the Royal Commission on Newspapers, commonly known as the Kent Commission.

To many, it seemed that possibly-illegal collusion to reduce competition had occurred. Charges were brought against both Southam and Thomson in April 1981 under the now-defunct Combines Investigation Act that alleged a breach of section 33 by merger or monopolistic conduct, but they were dismissed on 9 December 1983.

Ottawa went without a second major newspaper until the debut of the Ottawa Sun in 1988.

The paper's politics were generally regarded as conservative.

Notable staff
 Basil O'Meara, sports editor during the 1920s
 Bill Westwick, columnist and sports editor from 1926 to 1973
 Eddie MacCabe, columnist and sports editor from 1946 to 1977

References

Sources
 

Newspapers published in Ottawa
Defunct newspapers published in Ontario
Publications established in 1885
Publications disestablished in 1980
Daily newspapers published in Ontario
1885 establishments in Ontario
Conservative media in Canada